Affo is both a surname and a given name. Notable people with the name include:

Frédéric Affo (1943–2011), Beninese politician
Ireneo Affò (1741–1797), Italian historian
Affo Erassa (born 1983), Togolese footballer